In enzymology, a cis-1,2-dihydro-1,2-dihydroxynaphthalene dehydrogenase is an enzyme that catalyzes the chemical reaction

cis-1,2-dihydronaphthalene-1,2-diol + NAD+  naphthalene-1,2-diol + NADH + H+

Thus, the two substrates of this enzyme are cis-1,2-dihydronaphthalene-1,2-diol and NAD+, whereas its 3 products are naphthalene-1,2-diol, NADH, and H+.

This enzyme belongs to the family of oxidoreductases, specifically those acting on the CH-CH group of donor with NAD+ or NADP+ as acceptor.  The systematic name of this enzyme class is cis-1,2-dihydronaphthalene-1,2-diol:NAD+ 1,2-oxidoreductase. Other names in common use include (+)-cis-naphthalene dihydrodiol dehydrogenase, naphthalene dihydrodiol dehydrogenase, and cis-dihydrodiol naphthalene dehydrogenase.  This enzyme participates in 1- and 2-methylnaphthalene degradation and naphthalene and anthracene degradation.

References

 

EC 1.3.1
NADH-dependent enzymes
Enzymes of unknown structure